Arokiaswamy Velumani (born April 1959) is an Indian scientist and entrepreneur. He is the founder, chairman and managing director of Thyrocare Technologies Ltd. a chain of diagnostic and preventive care laboratories headquartered in Navi Mumbai. He is the founder and managing director of Nueclear Healthcare Limited, a radiology diagnostics company affiliated to Thyrocare.

Early life
Velumani was born in April 1959 to a landless farmer in the village of Appanaickenpatti Pudur, near Coimbatore in Coimbatore district of the Indian state of Tamil Nadu. His father was a farmer and his mother was a housewife, who took up rearing buffaloes and selling their milk to sustain the family.  Velumani studied at Sri Venkateswara High School, Pappanaickenpatti Pudur. He obtained his B.Sc. Degree from Ramakrishna Mission Vidyalaya, affiliated to University of Madras in 1978 at age 19. He earned a master's degree in 1985 and later a doctor's degree in Thyroid Biochemistry in 1995 from University of Mumbai while working with Bhabha Atomic Research Centre (BARC), a nuclear research facility based in Mumbai, Maharashtra.

Career
After graduating in 1978, Velumani began with a job in 1979 at Gemini Capsules, a small pharmaceutical company in Coimbatore, Tamil Nadu as a shift chemist. After three years, the company was shut down. He then worked at Bhabha Atomic Research Centre (BARC) first as a laboratory assistant, staying for 14 years. During this time he pursued his Master's and Doctor's degree and rose to the rank of scientist. He later was posted at the Radiation Medicine Centre (RMC), a BARC department at Tata Memorial Hospital in Parel, Mumbai, Maharashtra.

Velumani decided to set up his own thyroid testing laboratory, Thyrocare, in 1996. He introduced a franchisee model in his diagnostic laboratory and offered affordable testing services. Thyrocare expanded from testing for thyroid disorders to preventive medical checkups and other diagnostic blood tests.

Under his leadership Thyrocare became the largest thyroid testing laboratory, with a network of more than 1000 outlets across India, Nepal, Bangladesh and the Middle East. In April 2016, Thyrocare conducted its Initial Public Offer (IPO) release, achieving over-subscription of 72.86 times.

Velumani is also the founder and managing director of Nueclear Healthcare Ltd. (NHL) a radiology diagnostics company with its main branch at Navi Mumbai, Maharashtra. This project offers cancer-related imaging services at half the cost of other providers. Dr. A. Velumani has also launched two healthcare brands, namely Focus TB, focused on affordable and quality TB diagnostics and Aarogyam, a wellness preventive healthcheck packages. He is also a passionate motivational and business speaker at corporate events.

Personal life
During his working career at BARC at age 27, Velumani married Sumathi, daughter of J. K. Rao and Sarak Rao. Sumathi was working with the State Bank of India until the couple decided to leave their jobs to start Thyrocare. The couple have a son – Anand (born 1989) and a daughter – Amruta (born 1991) who were born during Velumani's working career at BARC. Sumathi Velumani was diagnosed with pancreatic cancer in October 2015 and died on 13 February 2016 at age 55. Velumani continues to live along with his son and daughter in company quarters situated in the main headquarters of Thyrocare at Navi Mumbai.

References

1959 births
Living people
Indian biochemists